Kodanchery  is a town in Kozhikode district in the state of Kerala, India.

Nearby towns include  Thamarassery, Thiruvambady, Nellipoyil, and Thusharagiri Falls. It is under Thiruvambadi Assembly Constituency. Kodanchery is a Panchayat headquarters.

Demographics
 India census, Kodanchery had a population of 18,461 with 9,233 males and 9,228 females.

Thiruvambady, Pullurampara, Nellipoyil, and Engapuzha are nearby villages of kodanchery. St. Mary's Forane Church, which is a Marian Pilgrimage Center, and St. Joseph's HSS school are located in the heart of the city. It is a plantation destination that abounds in rubber, areca nut, pepper, ginger and various spices. The famous tourist destination Thusharagiri waterfalls is just 10 km from Kodanchery town and 50 km from Kozhikode City.

Culture and people
Though the population is diverse, Kodanchery is a hub of Christians ,mainly Saint Thomas Christians. It is known as mini Kottayam, as most of the people are migrated from different parts of Kottayam.

Administration 
Kodanchery is part of Thiruvambady legislative assembly constituency and  Wayanad parliamentary constituency. The current MLA is Linto Joseph (Indian politician)]. The current MP is Rahul Gandhi.The Grama Panchayat President is Sri Alex Thomas. It is divided into 21 wards. It is in the limits of three Villages - Kodancherry, Koodathai and Nellipoil but in only one Police Station - Kodancherry. PIN Code of Kodancherry is 673580.

History 
The first church in Kodenchery was started at Ambalamkunnu near Kannoth. As the population increased, it was moved to Ambattupadi for convenience, and later to the town where the Kodanchery LP School is situated.

Tourism 
Thusharagiri Falls are a tourist destination in the Malabar region, with five water falls right in the middle of the forest. Two  streams originating from the Western Ghats meet here to form the Chalippuzha River. The river diverges into three waterfalls creating a snowy spray, which gives the name, 'Thusharagiri' ("snow capped mountains"). The highest waterfall is the Thenpara (honey hill) that falls from an altitude of 75 metres.
Chembukkadavu Weir is a small diversion dam situated in Chalippuzha river

Education 
Govt.College Kodancherry
St. Joseph's Higher Secondary School
 St.Mary's English medium school Kodenchery.(CBSE)
 St. George's Higher Secondary School Velamcode

Transportation
Kodenchery village connects to other parts of India through Calicut city on the west and Thamarassery town on the east.  National highway 66 passes through Kozhikode and the northern stretch connects to Mangalore, Goa and Mumbai.  The southern stretch connects to Cochin and Trivandrum.  The eastern National Highway 766 going through Adivaram connects to Kalpetta, Mysore and Bangalore. The nearest airports are at Kannur and Kozhikode.  The nearest railway station is at Kozhikode.

References

Thamarassery area